Katharina Bauer (born 12 June 1990 in Wiesbaden) is a German athlete specialising in the pole vault. She represented her country at the 2019 World Championships in Doha without qualifying for the final. In addition, she twice reached the final at the European Indoor Championships.

Her personal bests in the event are 4.65 metres outdoors (Beckum (GER) and 4.60 metres indoors (Leverkusen 2015).

International competitions

1No mark in the final

Personal life 
Having problems with abnormally fast heartbeat since her youth, she competes with an implantable cardioverter-defibrillator (ICD) in her chest.

References

1990 births
Living people
German female pole vaulters
World Athletics Championships athletes for Germany
Sportspeople from Wiesbaden